Staples station is an Amtrak intercity train station in Staples, Minnesota, United States, served by Amtrak's daily Empire Builder service. It was built in December 1909 by the Northern Pacific Railway. The architects of the station were Charles A. Reed and Allen H. Stem, who also designed the Northern Pacific's King Street Station in Seattle, Washington, and the New York Central Railroad's Grand Central Terminal in New York City.

In the mid-2000s the city began negotiations with BNSF with the intent to purchase and rehabilitate the depot, which was largely empty and not well maintained. The sale was finalized in February 2008 and the depot is now owned and managed by the Staples Historical Society (SHS). Since then the SHS has undertaken a handful of important improvement projects, such as installing a new roof and repairing historic windows. The group is also searching for funding to undertake a full-scale rehabilitation of the interior and mechanical systems. Ultimately the SHS hopes to restore the second floor so that it can house the Staples Historical Society Museum. The local chamber of commerce currently occupies the ticket office adjacent to the waiting room.

The station was listed on the National Register of Historic Places on June 13, 2008.

References

External links

Staples Amtrak Station (USA Rail Guide -- Train Web)

Amtrak stations in Minnesota
Neoclassical architecture in Minnesota
Former Northern Pacific Railway stations
Railway stations on the National Register of Historic Places in Minnesota
Railway stations in the United States opened in 1909
Transportation in Todd County, Minnesota
National Register of Historic Places in Todd County, Minnesota